George Herbert Henshaw (April 18, 1918 – August 20, 2003) was an American set designer. He was known for his work on the television programs Hawaii Five-O and Magnum, P.I..

Henshaw attended at Punahou School, and graduated from Stanford University before working as a newspaper columnist. He then attended Officer Candidate School and served in World War II, being taken prisoner by the Japanese forces and promoted to lieutenant commander upon his release. He then worked in Los Angeles, California at CBS Studios as an usher. Henshaw was also a songwriter. 

He died in August 2003 at the Queen's Medical Center in Honolulu, Hawaii, at the age of 85. Henshaw was buried in Oahu Cemetery.

References

External links 

1918 births
2003 deaths
American set decorators
Burials at Oahu Cemetery